Gesine Cukrowski (born 23 October 1968) is a German actress.

Filmography 

 1989: Praxis Bülowbogen (4 episodes)
 1991: Aufstand der Dinge
 1994: Und tschüss! (13 episodes)
 1994: Praxis Bülowbogen (11 episodes)
 1995: Rosa Roth: Verlorenes Leben
 1995: Und tschüss auf Mallorca
 1996: Schwurgericht: Ein Kind war Zeuge 
 1996: Und tschüss in Amerika
 1996: Mein Papa ist kein Mörder
 1996: Blutige Rache
 1996: 60 Minuten Todesangst
 1998: The Sleeper
 1998: Tatort: Engelchen flieg
 1998: SOKO 5113: Der Überläufer
 1998-2007: Der letzte Zeuge (71 episodes)
 1999: T.E.A.M. Berlin: Der Verrat
 2000: Kilimanjaro: How to Spell Love
 2000: Der Bulle von Tölz: Tödliches Dreieck
 2000: Die Kommissarin: Abschiedskonzert
 2001: Bel Ami - Liebling der Frauen
 2002: Donna Leon - Venezianisches Finale
 2002: Edel & Starck: Seitensprung am Weidezaun
 2002: FearDotCom
 2003: Wunschkinder und andere Zufälle
 2003: Donna Leon: Acqua Alta
 2003: Balko: Der Racheengel
 2003: Ein Fall für zwei: Nebengeschäfte
 2003: Der Bestseller: Wiener Blut
 2004: Lieben und Töten
 2004: Der Bestseller
 2004: Judith Kemp
 2004: Wolffs Revier: Spätfolge
 2005: Das Duo: Man lebt nur zweimal
 2005: Krieg der Frauen
 2005: Die Spielerin
 2005: Die Hochzeit meiner Töchter
 2006: 
 2006: Rettet die Weihnachtsgans
 2006: Das Duo: Man lebt nur zweimal
 2006: Eine Robbe zum Verlieben
 2007: Eine Robbe und das große Glück
 2007: Alarm für Cobra 11 - Die Autobahnpolizei: Entführt
 2007: 
 2007: Das letzte Aufgebot
 2007: Annas Albtraum kurz nach 6
 2007: Der Kriminalist: Dunkles Geheimnis
 2008: 
 2008: Tatort: Blinder Glaube
 2008: Ein Fall für zwei: Geplatzte Träume
 2009: Zwischen heute und morgen
 2009: Licht über dem Wasser
 2009: Faktor 8 - Der Tag ist gekommen
 2009: Die Bremer Stadtmusikanten
 2009: Unter anderen Umständen: Auf Liebe und Tod
 2010: Nemesis
 2010: Das Duo: Mordbier
 2010: Morgen musst Du sterben
 2010: Tulpen aus Amsterdam
 2010: Racheengel - Ein eiskalter Plan
 2011: Leipzig Homicide: Letzter Abend DDR
 2011: Marie Brand und die letzte Fahrt
 2011: Flemming: Sexsüchtig
 2011: Der Staatsanwalt: Tödlicher Pakt
 2011: Ein starkes Team: Am Abgrund
 2011: Familie für Fortgeschrittene
 2011: Weihnachten ... ohne mich, mein Schatz!
 2012: Emilie Richards: Spuren der Vergangenheit
 2012: Dora Heldt: Bei Hitze ist es wenigstens nicht kalt
 2012: Notruf Hafenkante: Der Prozess
 2013: Fliegen lernen
 2013: Ein Sommer in Portugal
 2013: Cologne P.D.: Der stille Mord
 2013: Herzensbrecher - Vater von vier Söhnen
 2013: Grenzgang
 2013: SOKO 5113: Es bleibt in der Familie
 2014: 
 2014: Katie Fforde: Geschenkte Jahre
 2014: Gegen den Sturm!
 2014: Das Traumschiff: Mauritius
 2015: Der Bergdoktor (3 episodes)
 since 2015: Letzte Spur Berlin
 2015: Ein starkes Team: Tödliches Vermächtnis
 2016: Heiter bis tödlich: Akte Ex - Die Lüge
 2016: Inga Lindström: Familienbande
 2016: Wilsberg: Mord und Beton
 2017: The Old Fox: Therapie für Tote
 2017: Alarm für Cobra 11 - Die Autobahnpolizei: Die verlorenen Kinder
 2018: Katie Fforde: Mama allein zu Haus
 2018: Doppelzimmer für drei
 2018: Der Richter

References 

1968 births
Living people
Actresses from Berlin
German film actresses
German stage actresses
German television actresses
20th-century German actresses
21st-century German actresses